Alexander Nathaniel Gaston (March 12, 1893 – February 8, 1979) was a catcher in Major League Baseball who played between  and  for the New York Giants (1920–1923) and Boston Red Sox (1926, 1929). He was born in New York City. His younger brother, Milt Gaston, was a major league pitcher.

Gaston grew up in Ridgefield Park, New Jersey and attended Ridgefield Park High School.

In a six-season career, Gaston was a .218 hitter (112-for-514) with three home runs and 40 runs batted in in 215 games, including 58 runs, 13 doubles, six triples, and five stolen bases.

Although the New York Giants won the World Series in 1921 and 1922, Gaston did not see postseason action in either year. Alex Gaston was a batterymate of his brother Milt with the 1929 Boston Red Sox.

Gaston died in Marina del Rey, California at age 85.

References

External links

1893 births
1979 deaths
Major League Baseball catchers
Baseball players from New Jersey
Baseball players from New York (state)
New York Giants (NL) players
Boston Red Sox players
Minor league baseball managers
People from Ridgefield Park, New Jersey
Ridgefield Park High School alumni
Sportspeople from Bergen County, New Jersey
Fitchburg Burghers players